Andrzej Waldemar Korzyński (2 March 1940 – 18 April 2022) was a Polish composer whose work ranged from some of the biggest hits from the 1960s to the early nineties, a popular children's musical ("Akademia Pana Kleksa") and scores for some of the best Polish films of the second half of the 20th century — including Andrzej Wajda's (The Birch Wood, Man of Marble) and Andrzej Żuławski's (The Devil, Possession). 

Born in Warsaw, Korzyński graduated from the Fryderyk Chopin University of Music in 1964. He was a member of the Polish Film Academy.

References

External links
 Monoskop.org
 
 

1940 births
2022 deaths
Polish film score composers
Male film score composers
Chopin University of Music alumni
Recipients of the Silver Medal for Merit to Culture – Gloria Artis
Musicians from Warsaw